Sai Pallavi Senthamarai Kannan (born 9 May 1992) is an Indian actress and dancer who appears in Tamil, Telugu and Malayalam films. She has won several awards including four Filmfare Awards South and two SIIMA Awards. She was featured by Forbes magazine as one of India's 30 under 30 in 2020. 

Pallavi made her acting debut with  2015 Malayalam film Premam, which was the second highest-grossing Malayalam film till then, for which she received critical praise. She has since established herself in Telugu, Tamil and Malayalam cinema with acclaimed performances in successful films like Kali (2016), Fidaa (2017), Middle Class Abbayi (2017), Maari 2 (2018), Love Story (2021), Shyam Singha Roy (2021) and Gargi (2022).

Early life and education 

Sai Pallavi was born on 9 May 1992 in a Badaga family in Coimbatore, Tamil Nadu. Her hometown is Kotagiri in the Nilgiris district, Tamil Nadu. Born to Senthamarai Kannan and Radha, She has a younger sister, Pooja, who has also worked as an actress. She was raised and educated in Coimbatore, doing her schooling at Avila Convent School.

Despite completing her medical studies in 2016 from the Tbilisi State Medical University which is recognised by Medical Council of India, she has not yet registered as a medical practitioner in India. She took her Foreign Medical Graduate Examination (FMGE) on 31 August 2020 in Trichy. 
Pallavi can speak fluently in Tamil, English, Hindi and Georgian. She later learnt Malayalam and Telugu following a career in their respective cinema industries.

Career

Dance career 
Pallavi said in an interview that though she was not a trained dancer, but she always wanted to do something that involved dancing. She participated in several cultural events at school, gaining popularity as a dancer. Due to her passion for dance, which was supported by her mother, she participated in the dance reality show Ungalil Yaar Adutha Prabhu Deva on Vijay TV in 2008, and was a finalist in Dhee Ultimate Dance Show (D4) on ETV in 2009.

Debut, breakthrough and critical acclaim (2005–2016)

Pallavi appeared in uncredited roles as a child actress in Kasthuri Maan (2005) and Dhaam Dhoom (2008).

In 2014, while she was studying in Tbilisi, Georgia, film-director Alphonse Puthren offered her the role of Malar in his film Premam. She shot the film over the holidays and, after the shooting finished, returned to her studies. She went on to win several "Best Female Debut" awards that year, including the Filmfare Award for Best Female Debut.

In late 2015, Studio Green signed up Pa. Ranjith to direct a film for their production house after they had bought and distributed the director's successful previous venture, Attakathi (2012). He confirmed that he would shortly begin work on a project titled Madras with Karthi in the lead role. For that she was the first and director's strong choice of the female lead but she denied the film offer due to pursue her medical studies in Georgia. Then she took a month break from her studies to act in her second Malayalam film, Kali, which released in March 2016. She portrayed Anjali, a young wife who must deal with her husband's extreme anger issues, earning a nomination for Filmfare Award for Best Actress – Malayalam.

As an established actress (2017–present)
The year 2017 marked her debut in Telugu with Sekhar Kammula's Fidaa, in the role of Bhanumathi, a feisty village girl from Telangana. Her performance in the film is regarded as one of the "100 Greatest Performances of the Decade" by Film Companion. She went onto win her first Filmfare Award for Best Actress - Telugu. Her next project with director A. L. Vijay announced that he would be working on a film with her for Lyca Productions and that he would direct a script he had written "three and a half years ago". He had chosen to cast Sai Pallavi, after another project for Pramod Films, which would have been a Tamil remake of the Malayalam film Charlie (2015) with Madhavan, was suddenly shelved. After securing the actress's dates to shoot the film, Vijay finalised the technical crew to include his regular collaborators such as cinematographer Nirav Shah and editor Anthony. For Sai Pallavi, it became her first Tamil language film following a series of projects which she dropped out of, she was replaced in or was shelved. She had previously been cast and then replaced in Mani Ratnam's Kaatru Veliyidai (2017), while she opted out Vijay Chander's Sketch (2017). Likewise, earlier, her films Charlie and Rajiv Menon's Saravam Thaala Maayam were indefinitely postponed. Finally, it was Diya, which is a Tamil–Telugu bilingual film and had an average run at the box office.
In May 2018, it was reported that Vijay Deverakonda will join with debutant director Bharat Kamma for a new film. The first look poster of the film was unveiled on Devarakonda's birthday, 9 May 2018, For that she was earlier chosen for the film's female lead. However, she rejected the script due to the lip-lock scenes between the lead actors.
Later, she starred in the Tamil movie Maari 2, a sequel to Maari (2015), opposite Dhanush, directed by Balaji Mohan. A song from the movie, "Rowdy Baby", is the most viewed song in YouTube from South India.

Pallavi started shooting in February 2018 for the film Padi Padi Leche Manasu with Sharwanand, which was a huge commercial failure. In December, several news outlets reported that she refused to accept her full remuneration, expressing solidarity with the producers for the failure of the film. In 2019, she portrayed an autistic girl in the psychological thriller Athiran opposite Fahadh Faasil.

In 2020, she was recognised by Forbes magazine as one of India's 30 under 30. She was the only person from film industry in that list. She also acted in a Netflix anthology film series Paava Kadhaigal segment Oor Iravu directed by Vetrimaaran. In 2021, she starred in the romantic drama Love Story alongside Naga Chaitanya in her second collaboration with Sekhar Kammula after Fidaa (2017) and Shyam Singa Roy opposite Nani in their second collaboration after MCA. In 2022 she appeared in Telugu film Virata Parvam opposite Rana Daggubati. 
For her Tamil film Gargi, she dubbed her own lines in both Telugu and Kannada. Her next film will be in Tamil along with Sivakarthikeyan produced by Kamal Hassan under Raaj Kamal Films International directed by Rajkumar Periyasamy. And currently she is in talks of Nitesh Tiwari and Ravi Udyawar’s direction, Allu Aravind 's Geetha Arts production presents Ramayana to play Goddess Sita, starring Hrithik Roshan and Ranbir Kapoor which eventually make her Bollywood debut.

Media image

Pallavi became the only actress to feature in Forbes Indias 30 under 30 list of 2020. She stood at the 20th place in its most influential stars on Instagram in South cinema for the year 2021 list. 

In June 2022 in an interview with GreatAndhra, she commented that the film The Kashmir Files portrayed the killings of Kashmiri Pandits, during the 1990 exodus, and further asked if that is a religious conflict then what should be the difference between itself and cow vigilantism, referring to a recent incident where a Muslim was driving cows was beaten up and later forced to chant "Jai Shri Ram". The interview soon went viral and attracted criticism online. She later issued a clarification statement on her Instagram handle that her statements in the interview were misunderstood, and that she would neither trivialize a tragedy nor be comfortable with mob lynchings.

Filmography

Films

Television

Awards and nominations

References

External links 

 

Actresses in Malayalam cinema
Living people
Actresses from Tamil Nadu
Indian film actresses
Indian Hindus
21st-century Indian actresses
Medical students
People from Nilgiris district
Actresses in Tamil cinema
Actresses in Telugu cinema
South Indian International Movie Awards winners
Tbilisi State Medical University alumni
Filmfare Awards South winners
1992 births
People from Coimbatore